Stanhope House is a grade II listed building at 46 and 47 Park Lane, Mayfair, London W1.

It was built in 1899–1901 to a design by W. H. Romaine-Walker and Francis Besant. The building was commissioned by the soap manufacturer Robert William Hudson.

It was grade II listed in 1958. In 1969–1970, after a fire, the interior was renovated.

The building is now commercial offices, and in 1999 was purchased, refurbished, and let out as offices by HAB Group, a privately owned property development and investment company in the Turks and Caicos Islands.

Stanhope House and Dudley House are the only two left of the original ten mansions that lined Park Lane in 1900.

References

External links
 

Grade II listed houses in the City of Westminster
Houses completed in 1901
Gothic Revival architecture in London